K2R Riddim is a French Reggae band from Cergy-Pontoise, France; who began their journey in Reggae/Dub/Ska music in 1992.  K2R plays mostly reggae and Dub music; and primarily sing in French.

Band members
Loïc - Lead Vocals
Lord Bitum - Lead Vocals
Dorothée - Trumpet, Vocals
Tibo - Guitars, Vocals
Thierry - Bass, Double Bass
Christophe - Saxophone, Flute
Mano - Lead Drums
Pat - Trombone
Yvan - Drums
Meddhy - Keyboards

Discography
K2 Airlines (2006)
Bizness Classe (2006)
Les Routes De 1 Indépendance (2005)
Foule Contact (2005)
Decaphonik (2004)
Appel d'R (2001)
Live (1999)
Carnet de Roots (1998)

External links
 K2R Riddim Website (with music extracts)
 French Wikipedia page

French reggae musical groups
Dub musical groups
Musical groups established in 1992
Musical groups from Île-de-France